Emarosa is the second studio album by American rock band Emarosa. It was released on June 29, 2010 through Rise Records. The album was produced by Brian McTernan, and it is also the last album to feature vocalist Jonny Craig.

Track listing

An unreleased 2010 demo of the project contained two additional tracks:
"Share the Sunshine Young Blood"
"Live It. Love It. Lust It."
"I Still Feel Her, Part IV"
"We Are Life"
"Truth Hurst While Laying on Your Back"
"Pretend.Relive.Regret."
"The Game Played Right"
"The Weight of Love Blinds Eyes"
"Untitled #2"
"A Toast to the Future Kids!"
"Untitled #1"
"Broken vs. the Way We Were Born"

Personnel

Emarosa
 Jonny Craig – lead vocals
 ER White – lead guitar
 Jonas Ladekjaer – rhythm guitar
 Will Sowers – bass
 Lukas Koszewski – drums
 Jordan Stewart – keyboards

Additional personnel
 Brian McTernan – production, mixing
 Kris Crummett – mastering, vocal engineering
 Paul Leavitt – mastering
 Eric Rushing and Sean Heydorn (The Artery Foundation) – management
 Jeremy Holgersen (The Agency Group) – booking
 Glenn Thomas (We Are Synapse) – art direction, design

Charts

References

2010 albums
Rise Records albums
Emarosa albums
Albums produced by Brian McTernan